Glencullen Standing Stone is a standing stone and National Monument located in Glencullen, County Dublin, Ireland.

Location

Glencullen Standing Stone is located on Barrack Road, Glencullen.

History

The stone (made of quartz) is supposed to have been erected c. 1700 BC. Legend has it that Viking invaders used the stones in a game of "rings." It is also known as "Queen Mab."

References

National Monuments in County Dublin